Maricica is a Romanian female given name:

Maricica Puică (née Luca), a retired Romanian Olympic middle-distance runner.
Maricica Țăran, retired Romanian-German Olympic rower

See also
Maria (disambiguation)
Marioara
Marcel (disambiguation)

References

Romanian feminine given names